William "Bill" Louis Barry (born 16 October 1940) is a retired English rower.

Rowing career
He won a silver medal in the coxless fours at the 1964 Olympics. He also won the Wingfield Sculls in 1963–1966, all in single sculls.

He represented England and won a silver medal in the single sculls at the 1962 British Empire and Commonwealth Games in Perth, Western Australia.

Coaching
Barry was coach to Alan Campbell, who won a bronze medal in the single sculls at the 2012 Olympics. He is also the great-nephew of former world professional champion Ernest Barry.

References

1940 births
Living people
English male rowers
Olympic rowers of Great Britain
Rowers at the 1964 Summer Olympics
Olympic silver medallists for Great Britain
Olympic medalists in rowing
Medalists at the 1964 Summer Olympics
Rowers at the 1962 British Empire and Commonwealth Games
Commonwealth Games medallists in rowing
Commonwealth Games silver medallists for England
Medallists at the 1962 British Empire and Commonwealth Games